The Mesquite Outlaws are an American professional indoor soccer franchise based in Mesquite, Texas. Founded in 2019, the team made its debut in the Major Arena Soccer League with the 2019–20 season. Their first season was ended early due to Coronavirus disease of 2019. The Outlaws are owned by Mehrdad Moayadi, a real-estate developer in the Dallas–Fort Worth metroplex. The team is located just 32 miles from crosstown rival the Dallas Sidekicks. They are coached by Tatu who spent much of his career playing for the Sidekicks. Many of the players on the team were added from local tryouts that were held in Addison, Texas.

Year-by-year

Active players 
As of 22 May 2019

References

External links
 

Indoor soccer clubs in the United States
Major Arena Soccer League teams
2019 establishments in Texas
Association football clubs established in 2019
Mesquite, Texas
Sports in the Dallas–Fort Worth metroplex
Soccer clubs in Texas